Pilgrim on the Hill was a lost, early, non-science fiction novel by Philip K. Dick. It was written somewhere around 1956 according to one account, or between 1948 and 1950 according to another account. According to Lawrence Sutin's book, Divine Invasions: A Life of Philip K. Dick, the plot survives only as an index card synopsis from the publisher dated 11/08/1956 as follows:

"Another rambling, uneven totally murky novel. Man w/psychosis brought on by war thinks he's murdered his wife, flees. Meets 3 eccentrics: an impotent man who refuses to have sex w/his wife, the wife — a beautiful woman who's going to a quack dr. for treatment, an animalistic worker w/ambition but no talent. Man has affair w/wife, is kicked out by husband, tries to help slob. Finally collapses, is sent to hospital, recovers, returns home. BUT WHAT DOES IT ALL MEAN?"

There is some confusion whether this novel and another early, lost Philip K. Dick manuscript, The Earthshaker were the same book with different titles, a significant rewrite of the earlier book, or completely independent, unrelated stories.

According to at least one commentator, Phil said that his later novel Dr. Bloodmoney was to some extent based on a "Long ago straight novel" that Phil wrote. If Pilgrim on the Hill is this lost "straight" novel, then its overarching plot may have been superficially similar to the postapocalyptic Dr. Bloodmoney. However, it is equally likely that Earthshaker was the precursor to Bloodmoney, and had a superficially similar plot structure and setting.  Unless one or both manuscripts are rediscovered, this matter seems unlikely to ever be resolved.

References

See also

Bibliography of Philip K. Dick

1950s novels
American novel series
Lost books
Novels by Philip K. Dick